Templeman (sometimes known as Templeman Crossroads) is an unincorporated community in Westmoreland County, in the U. S. state of Virginia.

References
GNIS entry

Unincorporated communities in Westmoreland County, Virginia
Unincorporated communities in Virginia